The 2017 Rijeka local elections were held on 21 May and 4 June 2017 for the Mayor of Rijeka and members of the Rijeka city council. Vojko Obersnel, the 14th and incumbent mayor who has been in office since 2000, ran for a sixth consecutive four-year term, finishing in 1st place with 41,00% of the vote in the first round. However, as no candidate won an absolute majority of the vote in the first round, a second round of elections was held on 4 June 2017 between the two highest-ranked candidates in terms of popular vote: Vojko Obersnel of the Social Democratic Party of Croatia, and independent Hrvoje Burić . Obersenel defeated Burić by a wide margin in the run-off, taking 55,6% of the vote to Borić's 42,7%. Turnout in the election was 36,7% in the first round and 28,4% in the second round.

This was the third direct election for the mayor of Rijeka (simultaneously held with elections for all other county prefects and mayors in Croatia) since the popular vote method was introduced in 2009, as previously those officials had been elected by their county assemblies or city councils.

On 2 June a large number of cultural workers and athletes signed a public letter of support to the SDP candidate and the current mayor Vojko Obersnel. In the letter they state that "Rijeka is an example of an inclusive European city, the capital of all kinds of freedoms, especially those of art" and that it is appropriate that Rijeka retains the title of European Capital of Culture. They also expressed concerns about the other candidate Hrvoje Burić who, as a former city councilor, has long represented more than crude rhetoric with extreme conservative politics. Among the signatories are Mira Furlan and Luciano Sušanj.

Results

Mayoral election

City council election

See also
2017 Croatian local elections
List of mayors in Croatia

References 

Rijeka 2017
Rijeka 
[[Category:2017 in Croatia|Rijeka local]